Dry stone, sometimes called drystack or, in Scotland, drystane, is a building method by which structures are constructed from stones without any mortar to bind them together. Dry stone structures are stable because of their construction method, which is characterized by the presence of a load-bearing façade of carefully selected interlocking stones.
 
Dry stone construction is best known in the context of stone walls, traditionally used for the boundaries of fields and churchyards, or as retaining walls for terracing, but dry stone sculptures, buildings, bridges, and other structures also exist.  The term tends not to be used for the many historic styles which used precisely-shaped stone, but did not use mortar, for example the Greek temple and Inca architecture.
 
The art of dry stone walling was inscribed in 2018 on the UNESCO representative list of the intangible cultural heritage of humanity, for dry stone walls in countries such as France, Greece, Italy, Slovenia, Croatia, Switzerland and Spain.

History 

Some dry stone wall constructions in north-west Europe have been dated back to the Neolithic Age. In County Mayo, Ireland, an entire field system made from dry stone walls, since covered in peat, have been carbon-dated to 3800 BC. In Belize, the Mayan ruins at Lubaantun illustrate use of dry stone construction in architecture of the 8th and 9th centuries AD.
 
Great Zimbabwe in Zimbabwe, Africa, is an acropolis-like large city complex constructed in dry stone from the 11th to the 15th centuries AD. It is the largest of structures of similar construction throughout the area.
 
The cyclopean walls of the acropolis of Mycenae, Greece, have been dated to 1350 BC and those of Tiryns slightly earlier.

Location and terminology 
Terminology varies regionally. When used as field boundaries, dry stone structures are often known as dykes, particularly in Scotland, where professional dry stone wall builders are referred to as 'dykers'.  Dry stone walls are characteristic of upland areas of Britain and Ireland where rock outcrops naturally or large stones exist in quantity in the soil. They are especially abundant in the West of Ireland, particularly Connemara. They may also be found throughout the Mediterranean, including retaining walls used for terracing. Such constructions are common where large stones are plentiful (for example, in The Burren) or conditions are too harsh for hedges capable of retaining livestock to be grown as reliable field boundaries. Many thousands of kilometres of such walls exist, most of them centuries old.
 
In the United States they are common in areas with rocky soils, such as New England, New York, New Jersey, and Pennsylvania, and are a notable characteristic of the bluegrass region of central Kentucky as well as Virginia, where they are usually referred to as rock fences or stone fences, and the Napa Valley in north central California. The technique of construction was brought to America primarily by English and Scots-Irish immigrants. The technique was also taken to Australia (principally western Victoria and some parts of Tasmania and New South Wales) and New Zealand (especially Otago).
 
Similar walls also are found in the Swiss–Italian border region, where they are often used to enclose the open space under large natural boulders or outcrops.
 
The higher-lying rock-rich fields and pastures in Bohemia's south-western border range of Šumava (e.g. around the mountain river of Vydra) are often lined by dry stone walls built of field-stones removed from the arable or cultural land. They serve both as cattle/sheep fences and the lot's borders. Sometimes also the dry stone terracing is apparent, often combined with parts of stone masonry (house foundations and shed walls) that are held together by a clay and pine needle "composite" mortar.  
 
The dry stone walling tradition of Croatia was added to the UNESCO Representative List of the Intangible Cultural Heritage of Humanity in November 2018, alongside those of Cyprus, France, Greece, Italy, Slovenia, Spain and Switzerland. In Croatia, dry stone walls were built for a variety of reasons: to clear the earth of stone for crops; to delineate land ownership; or for shelter against the bora wind. Some walls date back to the Liburnian era. Notable examples include the island of Baljenac, which has  of dry stone walls despite being only  in area, and the vineyards of Primošten.
 

 
In Peru in the 15th century AD, the Inca made use of otherwise unusable slopes by building dry stone walls to create terraces. They also employed this mode of construction for freestanding walls. Their ashlar type construction in Machu Picchu uses the classic Inca architectural style of polished dry stone walls of regular shape. The Incas were masters of this technique, in which blocks of stone are cut to fit together tightly without mortar. Many junctions are so perfect that not even a knife fits between the stones. The structures have persisted in the high earthquake region because of the flexibility of the walls, and because in their double wall architecture, the two portions of the walls incline into each other.

Construction 

 
The style and method of construction of a wall will vary, depending on the type of stone available, its intended use and local tradition. Many older walls were constructed from stones and boulders cleared from the fields during preparation for agriculture (field stones) although some used stone quarried nearby. For modern walls, quarried stone is almost always used.

One type of wall is called a "double" wall and is constructed by placing two rows of stones along the boundary to be walled. The foundation stones are ideally set into the ground so as to rest firmly on the subsoil. The rows are composed of large flattish stones, diminishing in size as the wall rises. Smaller stones may be used as chocks in areas where the natural stone shape is more rounded. The walls are built up to the desired height layer-by-layer (course by course) and, at intervals, large tie-stones or through stones are placed which span both faces of the wall and sometimes project. These have the effect of bonding what would otherwise be two thin walls leaning against each other, greatly increasing the strength of the wall. Diminishing the width of the wall as it gets higher, as traditionally done in Britain, also strengthens the wall considerably. The voids between the facing stones are carefully packed with smaller stones (filling, hearting).
 
The final layer on the top of the wall also consists of large stones, called capstones, coping stones or copes. As with the tie stones, the capstones span the entire width of the wall and prevent it breaking apart. In some areas, such as South Wales, there is a tradition of placing the coping stones on a final layer of flat stones slightly wider than the top of the wall proper (coverbands).
 
In addition to gates, a wall may contain smaller purposely built gaps for the passage or control of wildlife and livestock such as sheep.
 
Boulder walls are a type of single wall in which the wall consists primarily of large boulders, around which smaller stones are placed. Single walls work best with large, flatter stones. Ideally, the largest stones are being placed at the bottom and the whole wall tapers toward the top. Sometimes a row of capstones completes the top of a wall, with the long rectangular side of each capstone perpendicular to the wall alignment.
 

 
Galloway dykes consist of a base of double-wall construction or larger boulders with single-wall construction above. They appear to be rickety, with many holes, which deters livestock (and people) from attempting to cross them. These dykes are principally found in locations with exceptionally high winds, where a solid wall might be at risk of being unsettled by the buffeting. The porous nature of the wall significantly reduces wind force but takes greater skill to construct. They are also found in grazing areas where they are used to maximize the utility of the available stones (where ploughing was not turning up ever more stones).
 
Another variation is the Cornish hedge or Welsh clawdd, which is a stone-clad earth bank topped by turf, scrub, or trees and characterised by a strict inward-curved batter (the slope of the "hedge"). As with many other varieties of wall, the height is the same as the width of the base, and the top is half the base width.
 

Different regions have made minor modifications to the general method of construction—sometimes because of limitations of building material available, but also to create a look that is distinctive for that area. Whichever method is used to build a dry stone wall, considerable skill is required. Correcting any mistakes invariably means disassembling down to the level of the error. Selection of the correct stone for every position in the wall makes an enormous difference to the lifetime of the finished product, and a skilled waller will take time making the selection.
 
As with many older crafts, skilled wallers, today, are few in number. With the advent of modern wire fencing, fields can be fenced with much less time and expense using wire than using stone walls; however, the initial expense of building dykes is offset by their sturdiness and consequent long, low-maintenance lifetimes. As a result of the increasing appreciation of the landscape and heritage value of dry stone walls, wallers remain in demand, as do the walls themselves. A nationally recognised certification scheme is operated in the UK by the Dry Stone Walling Association, with four grades from Initial to Master Craftsman.
 
Notable examples include:
 Mourne Wall: twenty-two mile long wall in the Mourne Mountains location in County Down, Northern Ireland
 Ottenby nature reserve, built by Charles X Gustav in mid 17th century, Öland, Sweden

Other uses 

While the dry stone technique is most commonly used for the construction of double-wall stone walls and single-wall retaining terracing, dry stone sculptures, buildings, fortifications, bridges, and other structures also exist.
 
Traditional turf-roofed Highland blackhouses were constructed using the double-wall dry stone method. When buildings are constructed using this method, the middle of the wall is generally filled with earth or sand in order to eliminate draughts. During the Iron Age, and perhaps earlier, the technique also was used to build fortifications such as the walls of Eketorp Castle (Öland, Sweden), Maiden Castle, North Yorkshire, Reeth, Dunlough Castle in southwest Ireland and the rampart of the Long Scar Dyke. Many of the dry-stone walls that exist today in Scotland can be dated to the 14th century or earlier when they were built to divide fields and retain livestock. Some extremely well built examples are found on the lands of Muchalls Castle.
 
Dry stone walls can be built against embankments or even vertical terraces. If they are subjected to lateral earth pressure, they are retaining walls of the type gravity wall. The weight of the stones resists the pressure from the retained soil, including any surcharges, and the friction between the stones causes most of them to act as if being a monolithic gravity wall of the same weight. Dry stone retaining walls were once built in great numbers for agricultural terracing and also to carry paths, roads and railways. Although dry stone is seldom used for these purposes today, a great many are still in use and maintained. New ones are often built in gardens and nature conservation areas. Dry stone retaining structures continue to be a subject of research.
 
In northeastern Somalia, on the coastal plain 20 km to Aluula's east are found ruins of an ancient monument in a platform style. The structure is formed by a rectangular dry stone wall that is low in height; the space in between is filled with rubble and manually covered with small stones. Relatively large standing stones are also positioned on the edifice's corners. Near the platform are graves, which are outlined in stones. 24 m by 17 m in dimension, the structure is the largest of a string of ancient platform and enclosed platform monuments exclusive to far northeastern Somalia. Burial sites near Burao in the northwestern part of the country likewise feature a number of old stelae.
 
In Great Britain, Ireland, France and Switzerland, it is possible to find small dry stone structures built as signs, marking mountain paths or boundaries of owned land. In many countries, cairns, as they are called in Scotland, are used as road and mountain top markers.

Gallery

See also 

 Anathyrosis (Greece)
 Broch (Scotland)
 Building material
 Cabanes du Breuil (France)
 Dry stone hut
 Great Zimbabwe (Zimbabwe)
 Machu Picchu (Peru)
 Mending Wall (USA)
 Nuraghe (Sardegna)
 Stone industry
 Stora Alvaret (Sweden)
 Trullo (Italy)
 Village des Bories (France)

References

Further reading 
 Colonel F. Rainsford-Hannay, Dry Stone Walling, Faber & Faber. 1957
 Alan Brooks and Sean Adcock, Dry Stone Walling, a practical handbook, TCV. 2013 
 Carolyn Murray-Wooley & Karl Raitz, Rock Fences of the Bluegrass, University Press of Kentucky. 1992.
 The Dry Stone Walling Association, Dry Stone Walling, Techniques and Traditions. 2004
 Louis Cagin & Laetitia Nicolas, Construire en pierre sèche, éditions Eyrolles. 2008
 Patrick McAfee, Irish Stone Walls: History, Building, Conservation, The O'Brien Press. 2011
 Alen MacWeeney (photog.) & Richard Conniff, The Stone Walls of Ireland. London: Thames & Hudson, 1986 ; New York: Stewart, Tabori & Chang, 1986

External links 

 How to build a dry stone wall
 Dry Stone Walling Association of Canada
 Dry Stone Walls Association of Australia
 The Dry Stone Wall Association of Ireland
 Dry Stone Walling Association of Great Britain
 Current Archaeology notes on Working Holidays repairing dry stone walls
 The Drystone Conservancy, USA
 Project Alpter, Terraced Landscapes of the Alpine Arc, a network of associations in Western Europe
 

Stonemasonry
Building stone
Types of wall
Fences
Stone (material)
Natural materials
Garden features
Architectural elements
Building materials
Stonemasons